John "Red" Raper (1911-1974) was a mycologist who studied genetic control of sexuality in fungi, mating type compatibility, fungal genetics, and taught at Harvard University among other places.

Scientific interests
Red Raper was a pioneer in the study of fungal sexual genetics. He studied mating systems in filamentous heterotrophs, beginning with the aquatic genus Achlya. Once thought to be fungi because of their filamentous growth form and nutritional habits, Achlya and other water molds are now known to belong to the Kingdom Chromalveolata. Red and Carlene (Cardy), later studied the genetic control of sexual reproduction in the gilled mushroom Schizophyllum commune. Red realized early on there were fungi that differed in aspects of compatibility and attributed these to what he called incompatibility factors A and B, further differentiating α and β in each. Some fungi have two mating types, termed bipolar, and others including some Red worked on, have thousands of mating types due to a more complicated mating type determination system. These two extreme strategies are thought to be involved with manipulating the chance of out versus self-crossing as evolutionary strategies. He and Cardy studied the events preceding karyogamy, including the transition from monokaryotic to dikaryotic. Much of Red’s work has spawned many research questions about sex in fungi addressed more recently using model organisms like Saccharomyces cerevisiae, Cryptococcus gattii, and Candida albicans. His research laid the foundation for the current knowledge body about somatic and sexual compatibility in fungi. Through the influence of Red's work, it is now understood that mating-type identity is determined by regions of the genome called mating type or MAT loci. These loci contain protein-coding regions for G protein-coupled receptors that sense ligands with varying specificity and signal through Mitogen-activated protein kinase cascades, as well as peptide pheromones and transcription factors involved in mate sensation, selection and reproduction.

Scientific history
Red’s interests in fungi began as an undergraduate. He was heavily influenced by his interactions as a Masters student working with mycologist John Crouch at the University of North Carolina at Chapel Hill. He then undertook graduate studies with William ‘Cap’ Weston at Harvard, resulting in his PhD in 1939. After Harvard Red left to study plant biology with John Bonner at the California Institute of Technology. The collaboration didn’t work out and he ended up studying what he called ‘hormone A’ from Achlya with Dr. A. J. Haagen-Smit. His first brief professor appointment at Indiana University was interrupted by his call to the Manhattan Project at Oak Ridge National Laboratory in Tennessee where he pioneered studies on the effects of Beta rays on rats. After working at Oak Ridge he took a position at the University of Chicago where he resumed efforts to determine the numbers and distributions of mating types from globally distributed fungi. One focus of his work was Schizophyllum commune. He returned to Harvard in 1954 where he chaired the Department of Biological Sciences and continued his research and mentorship of graduate students.

Awards & distinctions
Secretary, 1939, American Academy of Arts and Sciences
President, 1956, Mycological Society of America
Guggenheim Fellow, 1960, Cologne, Germany
Fulbright Scholar, 1960, Cologne, Germany
Visiting Professor in Genetics, 1967, Hebrew University
Award of Merit, 1969, Botanical Society of America
Chair of the Department of Biological Sciences, Harvard University
Elected to the National Academy of Sciences, 1964

Personal life
Red was born October 3, 1911 to Franklin & Julia Crouse Raper on a tobacco farm in Davidson County, just outside Winston-Salem, North Carolina. He was the youngest of 8 children. His brother Kenneth was also a mycologist. Beyond mycology and genetics, Red loved music and was an avid trumpet player. He contributed to the Moravian community brass choirs around his childhood home and later to the North Carolina Symphony. He was noted for his talent as a photographer and artist, regularly illustrating his own and others scientific publications.

References

1911 births
1974 deaths
American mycologists
Harvard University alumni
Harvard University faculty
Indiana University faculty
Oak Ridge National Laboratory people
People from Davidson County, North Carolina
University of Chicago faculty
University of North Carolina at Chapel Hill alumni